La Funivia del faloria (The Funicular of Mount Faloria ) is a 1950 Italian documentary film directed by Michelangelo Antonioni.

The film takes the viewer on a cable car ride through the Dolomites. Much of the film was shot in Cortina d'Ampezzo.

External links 
 

1950 films
Italian black-and-white films
1950s Italian-language films
Italian documentary films
1950 documentary films
Films set in the Alps
1950s Italian films